Akpoha is a village in Abi local government area of Cross River State, Nigeria. It lies between the border of Ebonyi State and Cross River State.

References 

Villages in Cross River State